Mulford is a Census-designated place (CDP) in and governed by Garfield County, Colorado, United States. The CDP is a part of the Glenwood Springs, CO Micropolitan Statistical Area. The population of the Mulford CDP was 174 at the United States Census 2010. The Carbondale post office (Zip Code 81623) serves the area.

Geography
Mulford is located in southeastern Garfield County, in the valley of the Roaring Fork River. It is bordered to the east by Catherine. Colorado State Highway 82 forms the northern edge of the Mulford CDP, leading northwest  to Glenwood Springs, the county seat, and southeast  to Aspen.

Demographics

See also

 List of census-designated places in Colorado

References

External links

 Garfield County website

Census-designated places in Garfield County, Colorado
Census-designated places in Colorado